Julian Keilson (November 19, 1924 – March 8, 1999 in Rochester, New York) was an American 
mathematician.
He was known for his work in probability theory.  His work in survival analysis is relevant to many fields, e.g., medical research, parts supply, asset depreciation, rental pricing, etc.

He got his B.Sc. in physics from Brooklyn College,
and M.Sc. and Ph.D. from Harvard University.  His Ph.D. thesis advisor was the Nobel Prize–winning professor of Physics, Julian Schwinger. Next he worked at
MIT Lincoln Laboratories and GTE Laboratories before joining the faculty at  University of Rochester (1966–96) where 
he started the statistics department.
He also  taught at MIT Sloan School of Management (1986–92).

Books
Green's functions in probability theory (1965)
Markov chain models -- rarity and exponentiality

References

20th-century American mathematicians
Brooklyn College alumni
Harvard University alumni
University of Rochester faculty
1924 births
1999 deaths
MIT Sloan School of Management faculty
MIT Lincoln Laboratory people